Yusuf Kifuma Chanzu is a Kenyan politician from Vihiga Constituency. He was elected to represent the Vihiga Constituency in the National Assembly of Kenya since the 1997 to 2002 and 2007 to 2013 Kenyan parliamentary election.

He was educated at Kakamega School.

References

 

Living people
Year of birth missing (living people)
Orange Democratic Movement politicians
Members of the National Assembly (Kenya)
Alumni of Kakamega School